The 2004–05 Cleveland Cavaliers season was the 35th season of the franchise in the National Basketball Association (NBA) in Cleveland, Ohio. During the offseason, the Cavaliers acquired Drew Gooden from the Orlando Magic, and Eric Snow from the Philadelphia 76ers. In his second season, expectations were high for LeBron James as the Cavaliers hoped for a playoff berth. Through the first half of the season, the Cavs held a 30–21 record at the All-Star Break as James was selected to his first All-Star selection in the 2005 NBA All-Star Game along with Zydrunas Ilgauskas. However, as March began, the Cavaliers were unable to upgrade at the trading deadline as the team went on a six-game losing streak. Head coach Paul Silas was fired and replaced by interim Brendan Malone. LeBron was named to the All-NBA Second Team, and finished in sixth place in MVP voting.

The Cavaliers finished the season with a 42–40 record, a fourth-place finish in the Central Division, and barely missed out of the playoffs, losing a tiebreaker for the #8 seed in the Eastern Conference to the New Jersey Nets. This was the seventh straight year that the Cavs missed the playoffs. Despite their collapse, James had an outstanding sophomore season averaging 27.2 points, 7.4 rebounds and 7.2 assists per game. This was the last time that LeBron missed the playoffs until his first season with the Los Angeles Lakers in 2019.

Key dates:
 On June 24, the 2004 NBA Draft, took place in New York City, New York.
 In July, the free agency period began.
 On September 15, the Cavaliers named Brendan Malone assistant coach.
 On October 14, the Cavaliers' preseason began with a 94–102 loss to Memphis.
 On November 3, the Cavaliers' regular season began with a 104–109 2OT loss to Indiana.
 On March 21, head coach Paul Silas was fired and Brendan Malone was named interim head coach. Mike Bratz and Wes Wilcox were added to Malone's staff as assistants.
 On April 20, the Cavaliers' season ended in a 104–95 win over the Toronto Raptors.
 On April 21, Jim Paxson was fired as President of Basketball Operations and general manager.

Offseason

Free Agents

*Selected in expansion draft

Trades

Draft picks

 2nd round pick (#39) traded to Toronto in Michael Stewart deal. Used to draft Albert Miralles who was then traded to Miami.

Roster

Regular season

Season standings

Record vs. opponents

Game log

Player stats

Regular season 

* Statistics include only games with the Cavaliers

Awards and records

Awards

Records

Milestones

All-Star
LeBron James voted as a starter for the 2005 NBA All-Star Game. He was appeared for the first time in the All-Star Game.

Zydrunas Ilgauskas - 2005 NBA All-Star Game

Transactions

Trades

Free Agents

Development League

References

Cleveland Cavaliers on Database Basketball
Cleveland Cavaliers on Basketball Reference
2004-05 Season Media Guide

Cleveland Cavaliers seasons
Cleve
Cleve